Andrea Christine Lea (born 1957) is an American politician who served as the Arkansas State Auditor and is a Republican former member of the Arkansas House of Representatives from Russellville, Arkansas. She was elected state auditor on November 4, 2014, to succeed the Democratic incumbent, Charlie Daniels, who did not seek reelection.

Background

Early political life and state legislature 

Lea was unopposed for a second House term in 2010. In 2012, Lea was switched to House District 71 and again ran without opposition. The previous representative, Democrat Tommy Wren, was transferred to District 62.

Lea was a member of the American Legislative Exchange Council (ALEC). The purpose of this council is to promote sample legislation written by corporations. She was the organization's co-state chairperson along with Eddie Joe Williams, also succeeding Michael Lamoureux in that role.

Legislation

State Auditor 
The office of State Auditor is one of Arkansas' seven constitutional offices. The State Auditor is the general accountant for the state and is also in charge of the payroll for the executive, legislative, and judicial branches. The office is also in charge of the state's unclaimed property program. The office has existed since Arkansas was made a United States territory in 1819. Its duties have changed very little since its inception. Lea is the third woman elected to the office of State Auditor. The first woman elected was Jimmie Lou Fisher. The second woman elected was Julia Hughes Jones. Lea is the first Republican woman elected as State Auditor in Arkansas.

The Great Arkansas Treasure Hunt 
The State Auditor's office in Arkansas is in charge of an unclaimed property program. This program is referred to as The Great Arkansas Treasure Hunt. The purpose of this program is to return lost money to their rightful owners. Cash assets and safety deposit box contents are turned over to the State Auditor's office after the institutions holding the property deem it abandoned. According to Lea, in Arkansas, there is $317,000,000 in the unclaimed property as of 2017. She stated that "Reuniting Arkansans with their money is something I take very seriously...We now estimate that 1 in 4 Arkansans has cash to claim in the Treasure Hunt. If you've searched in the past, it's time to search again!"

Election as President of NAUPA 
In January 2019, Lea was elected as the President of the National Association of Unclaimed Property Administrators (NAUPA). This organization is associated with the Association of State Auditors. Its purpose is to create awareness of the importance of unclaimed property as a necessary consumer protection program. Its members represent all fifty states, the District of Columbia, and all of the United States' territories. After Lea was elected as President of this organization, she stated, "I'm honored to be chosen by my colleagues to represent our organization and work to advance our common interest...I look forward to continuing to share our successes in Arkansas across the country and advocating for increased innovation and streamlining of services. It's a win for businesses, and a win for consumers."

Electoral history

References

|-

|-

|-

1957 births
21st-century American politicians
21st-century American women politicians
Arkansas city council members
American Presbyterians
Arkansas Tech University alumni
County justices of the peace in Arkansas
Living people
Republican Party members of the Arkansas House of Representatives
People from Newbury Park, California
Place of birth missing (living people)
State Auditors of Arkansas
Women city councillors in Arkansas
Women state legislators in Arkansas